FK Autonets or FK Dobele is Latvian football club located in Dobele. They play in Zemgales zona of Latvian Second League. It founded in 2004.

Players

First-team squad

Dobele
Autonets